Sandala may refer to:

Sandala, Israel, a village in northern Israel
Sandala, Côte d'Ivoire
A Tamil variation on Chandala, an opprobrious term in Sanskritic literature.